Desara Muriqi (27 May 1985) is an Albanian rally driver born in Shkodër. She moved to Sansepolcro, Italy in 2002, and in 2011 she took a degree in Foreign languages and literatures at the University of Siena.

In the 2011 FIA Alternative Energies Cup season, with the sixth place obtained in the Ecorally San Marino - Città del Vaticano (together with the Ukrainian co-driver Yulia Lutsyk on Gonow GA200), she reached the best result for a female team in the history of the FIA Alternative Energies Cup. She was also the first Albanian driver to gain points in an official FIA world championship.

References

See also
FIA Alternative Energies Cup
Massimo Liverani
Guido Guerrini (driver)

FIA E-Rally Regularity Cup drivers
Living people
Albanian rally drivers
1985 births
Sportspeople from Shkodër
University of Siena alumni